Pace University High School, also known as "Pace High School," is a public high school located in the New York City borough of Manhattan, affiliated with Pace University.

School history
Established by Pace University and the New York City Department of Education, Pace High School was founded with grants from New Visions for Public Schools with money donated from the Bill & Melinda Gates Foundation, the Carnegie Corporation of New York, and George Soros’ Open Society Institute. Pace High School opened its doors to its first class on September 13, 2004. The school is among the 330 out of over 1,400 New York City public schools (23.6%) designated as an Empowerment School, which allows it more autonomy in choosing a curriculum. Pace High School graduated its first class in 2008. Every student in the class graduated and was accepted at two- and four-year colleges. Pace University High School also awards the top five students of the graduating class a full 4-year scholarship to Pace University.

Overview
Located in lower Manhattan, Pace High School has a high level of involvement with the national Pace University, as it is ten blocks away from its New York City campus. Pace High School students are granted University identification badges, which allow them access to the University's campuses, computing system and e-mail, libraries, student union, gymnasiums, and cafeterias.

Incoming 9th-grade students participate in "First Summer" Freshman Retreat in August. In this freshman orientation, students spend three days and two nights at the Pace University Pleasantville-Briarcliff campus in Westchester County, New York getting to know the high school staff, students and school programs.

11th graders are placed in internships, as well as a community service component of 180 hours required for graduation; the goal being to create a résumé of quality educational experiences. Starting in the 11th grade, students can take classes for credit at Pace University.

Student body
The school accepts about 150 students each year out of more than 4000 applicants. 30% of the student body comes from Brooklyn and Queens, but the school has students from all five boroughs.

First Graduating Class 2008
Pace University High School graduated its first class in 2008. The graduation rate for the Class of 2008 was 100%. Students went on to many colleges. These include Baruch College, Brooklyn College, John Jay, Hunter College, Queens College, Binghamton University, Buffalo State, New Paltz, Stony Brook University, Cornell University, Pace University, St. John’s University, Syracuse University, Penn State University, and Rutgers University.

Second Graduating Class 2009
Pace University High School graduated its second class in 2009. Students went on to many colleges including Pace University, Middlebury College, Brooklyn College, John Jay, Penn State, Albany, Old Westbury, and Queens College, Brown University, Syracuse University, and many others

Third Graduating Class 2010
Already students have been accepted to schools like Penn State, St. John's University, Baruch College, Syracuse University, Pace University, New Paltz, Stony Brook University and Fordham University with some students receiving full scholarships to those universities.

Graduation Requirements
The general graduation requirements for PACE are the same as the New York City Department of Education, with several additional requirements.

The additional requirements for PACE diplomas are:

180 hours of community service
8 semesters of Advisory class
1 Senior Portfolio
1 Social Action Exit Project and Presentation (submitted with advisory at the end of Senior Year)

Advancement Placement Classes/Honors Classes
Currently, Pace High School offers a few AP Classes and some college level courses. Some classes are taught at [Pace University] at no charge to the students. Students will get college credits for the College Classes. AP classes are taught at the high school. To be placed in the AP classes, a student must maintain a B+ or higher average in their 10th/11th grade year. A few classes the school offers are:
College Bridge English
AP English Language and Composition
AP U.S. History
AP Environmental Science
AP Biology
AP Calculus AB
AP Computer Science2

The school also allows students with a high average in the 11th and 12 grade to take college courses for free at Pace University during the school year. To be eligible for College Bridge English, students must enroll during their 11th grade year to be granted a spot in their 12th grade year.

Awards
 In 2006, Pace High School received Region Nine Recognition for High Daily Attendance
 Received First Place in the Verizon/YMCA Marketing Exposition.
 In 2006 Pace High School was honored by the Blackboard Awards for the way it integrates technology into instruction and for its receptivity to parent involvement
 Pace University High School is also listed in Clara Hemphill's New York City's Best Public High Schools Guide.
 Pace University High School is listed as #38 out of 400 NYC Best High Schools by the New York Post

Extracurricular activities
Pace High School has many extracurricular activities for students. Extracurricular activities include fine arts, drama, student government, yearbook, literary magazine, debate team, anime, technology, film, step, and National Honor Society. Every year, the activities change.

Besides the intramural sports, the high school also participates in the Public Schools Athletic League (PSAL). The school sponsors men's and women's basketball, volleyball, and cross country teams. It also has women's track and softball teams, but its limited space restricts its athletic offerings. The school has a small outdoor track and field (rare for public schools in Manhattan), as well as a gym facility in the building that is shared with the middle school students and used only for gym class.

Field trips/Special Events
Field trips are twice a year and 4 groups of advisories separated by grade go to do certain activities each year.
such places area:
Brooklyn heights
 Dave and Buster's
AMC Theatres
Also, in the 11th grade, certain selected students from all English classes are given a chance to perform a poem at Nuyorican Poets Cafe in the lower east side. 
Events:
In October, they do an annual costume runway to showcase the students' costumes. In November, they do Pacegiving, which is a chance for students and alumni to have a fun time. In May, the students' perform at the last day to showcase their talents and celebrate the school's founding.

External links 
 Pace High School
 Pace University
 Inside Schools Report Card on Pace High School

Chinatown, Manhattan
Pace University
Educational institutions established in 2004
Public high schools in Manhattan
University-affiliated schools in the United States
2004 establishments in New York City